The Western Regional Research Center (WRRC), located in Albany, California, is one of four regional laboratories within the Agricultural Research Service of the United States Department of Agriculture. The WRRC has six research units, which conduct research into food production, processing, safety, bioproducts and invasive species control.

History 
The Western Regional Research Center (originally named Western Regional Research Laboratory) was established following the passage of the Agricultural Adjustment Act of 1938 that created scientific research centers in the nation's four major crop-growing centers. The others are the Eastern Regional Research Center in Wyndmoor, Pennsylvania, the Southern Regional Research Center in New Orleans, Louisiana, and the Northern Regional Research Center (now National Center for Agricultural Utilization Research) in Peoria, Illinois. Groundbreaking for the WRRC took place in June 1939, and the building was occupied beginning in 1940.

Organization 
There are currently six research units of the WRRC:
 Bioproducts Research: expanding use of crops by developing biobased products and biofuels
 Crop Improvement and Genetics Research: enhance productivity and value of food and biofuel crops
 Exotic and Invasive Weeds Research: develop and transfer biologically based approaches to invasive weed management
 Foodborne Toxin Prevention and Detection: enhance food safety and biosecurity by developing methods for analysis, prevention and elimination of toxins
 Healthy Processed Foods Research: enhance the healthfulness and marketability of foods
 Produce Safety and Microbiology Research: improving safety of the food supply through basic and applied research

Awards and recognition 
The WRRC was dedicated as a National Historic Chemical Landmark in 2002 for the development of time-temperature tolerance studies for frozen food production and in 2013 for developing flavor research methods and standards.

See also 
 United States Department of Agriculture (USDA)
 USDA Agricultural Research Service
 Eastern Regional Research Center
 Southern Regional Research Center
 National Center for Agricultural Utilization Research

External links 
 Western Regional Research Center — official website
 Western Regional Research Center (75th anniversary) - USDA ARS AgResearch magazine

References 

Agricultural research institutes in the United States
United States Department of Agriculture facilities
Research institutes in the San Francisco Bay Area
Albany, California
Research institutes in California